Leo and Me is a Canadian television sitcom that was produced in 1977 and aired in 1978.

It starred a 15-year-old Michael J. Fox, in his television acting debut, playing Jamie, the 12-year-old younger nephew of Leo (Brent Carver).

Leo and Me was produced by Don Eccleston, directed by Don S. Williams and written by Marc and Susan Strange.

Synopsis
Leo (Brent Carver) was a carefree, hard-living Italian adventurer who had won a large, decrepit yacht in a poker game, and had taken his orphaned nephew Jamie (Michael J. Fox) to live with him. Leo and Jamie lived on the yacht moored in the harbour. Leo's charm and good luck guided him through tricky but humorous situations and his young sidekick's adept mind helped the pair get out of trouble.

Parkinson's disease 
In 2002, an investigation was launched into Leo and Me after an unusual cluster of Parkinson's disease cases was noted among former cast and crew members of the show. Fox and director Don Williams were among the four with the disease, along with a writer and a cameraman.

When asked about the cluster by Howard Stern in a September 25, 2013, interview on The Howard Stern Show, Michael J. Fox stated, "Believe it or not, from a scientific point of view, that's not significant."  Donald Calne, a Vancouver neurologist, said the incidence of Parkinson's in society is about 1 in 300,  but that four of the 125 people on the Vancouver set of Leo and Me developed the disease. Calne said, "It could be coincidence. But it's intriguing, it might be something they were exposed to."

References

External links 
 

1970s Canadian sitcoms
CBC Television original programming
1978 Canadian television series debuts
1981 Canadian television series endings
Parkinson's disease